Cynaeda dentalis is a species of moth of the family Crambidae. It is found in Europe, Jordan, Turkey and Cape Verde.

The moth flies from June to August depending on the location.

The larvae feed on viper's bugloss (Echium vulgare).

References

External links

 Plant Parasites of Europe
 Lepidoptera of Belgium
 Cynaeda dentalis at UKmoths

Odontiini
Moths described in 1775
Moths of Asia
Moths of Cape Verde
Moths of Europe
Taxa named by Michael Denis
Taxa named by Ignaz Schiffermüller